The 15th Democratic Party of Japan presidential election took place on August 29, 2011. The election chose Yoshihiko Noda as the successor to Naoto Kan as president of the Democratic Party (Minshutō) of Japan; the designation of the new party president as prime minister in the Diet is planned for August 30 – Kan will remain acting prime minister until his successor's  formal appointment ceremony with the Emperor. In June 2011, Kan had announced to resign once three conditions have been met: passage of the second extra budget for fiscal 2011, passage of a bill to promote the use renewable energy and passage of a bill to issue new debt covering bonds. The extra budget was passed in July; after an agreement with the opposition was struck on reforming the child allowance introduced by the Democratic Party, the renewable energies bill and the bond ceiling increase passed through the Diet (including the opposition controlled House of Councillors) on August 26, 2011.

The official campaign period started on August 27. Issues in the campaign include the question of whether tax increases in the current election period are necessary to finance the budget deficit and the reconstruction after the Great Eastern Japanese Earthquake of March 2011, the issue of possible revisions to the party’s manifesto from the 2009 election and a possible Grand Coalition with the Liberal Democratic Party and Kōmeitō as proposed by Yoshihiko Noda early in the campaign.

Candidates
There were five candidates for party president Three, Kano, Mabuchi and Maehara, were eliminated in the first round of voting. 
 Yoshihiko Noda, Noda group, current finance minister in the Kan cabinet, already ran in 2002 for the party presidency.
 Seiji Maehara, Maehara group, former foreign minister in the Hatoyama and Kan cabinets and Democratic party president from 2005 to 2006.
 Banri Kaieda, Hatoyama group, trade and industry minister in the Kan cabinet, expected to be backed by Ichirō Ozawa.
 Sumio Mabuchi, no faction, but expected to be supported by some of Kan's intraparty opponents, former transportation and infrastructure minister in the Kan cabinet.
 Michihiko Kano, Hata group, agriculture minister in the Kan cabinet.
On August 27, the five candidates publicly responded to questions on current political issues in a nationally televised "joint press conference" at the Japan National Press Club. On August 28, the candidates debated on NHK's Sunday morning talk show Nichiyō Tōron.

Several other Democratic Representatives had indicated their intention to run, were exploring candidacies or were considered likely candidates. They included—
 Sakihito Ozawa, Hatoyama group, former environment minister in the Hatoyama and Kan cabinets.
 Shinji Tarutoko, Noda group, who ran for the party presidency against Kan with support from parts of the Ozawa group in 2010.
 Some members of the Yokomichi group (former Japanese Socialist Party) wanted to draft a member of their faction, Hirotaka Akamatsu, former agriculture minister in the Hatoyama cabinet, as their candidate for party president. The Kawabata group (former Democratic Socialist Party) was also exploring whether to nominate a candidate from their own ranks.

Any candidacy needs the support of at least 20 Democratic members of the Diet. As the 2011 election is a preliminary election due to a resignation, no primaries among party members and supporters will be held and prefectural and municipal assembly members will not take part in the vote. Only the currently 398 (excludes nine suspended members) Democratic Diet members are eligible to vote. If no candidate receives a majority in the first round, a runoff vote takes place between the top two candidates. The new party president will serve the remainder of Naoto Kan’s regular term, until autumn 2012, when a regular DPJ presidential election will be required. The general assembly of Democratic members of both houses of the Diet convenes in the New Ōtani Hotel in the Western centre of Tokyo (Chiyoda, Eastern Tokyo).

Results

In the first round of voting, Ozawa's favored candidate Kaieda won, but the losing candidates rallied behind Noda in the second, runoff vote.

Sources: NHK World

References

External links 
 Democratic Party: Past elections for the party presidency
 The Senkyo, election dictionary: Democratic Party presidential elections

2011 elections in Japan
Political party leadership elections in Japan
Indirect elections
Democratic Party (Japan, 1998) leadership election